The Horde is an accessory for the Advanced Dungeons & Dragons fantasy role-playing game.

Contents
The Horde is a Forgotten Realms accessory which explores the land known as the Endless Waste and the nomadic people who populate it.

Publication history
The Horde was written by David Cook, with a cover by Larry Elmore, and was published by TSR in 1990 as a boxed set containing two 64-page books, four large color maps, eight loose-leaf pages, 24 cardstock sheets, and a transparent map overlay.

Reception

Reviews

References

Forgotten Realms sourcebooks
Role-playing game supplements introduced in 1990